Thomas (the Tank Engine) & Friends is a children's television series about the engines and other characters working on the railways of the Island of Sodor, and is based on The Railway Series books written by the Reverend W. Awdry.

This article lists and details episodes from the fourth series of the show, which was broadcast in 1995. It was produced by Britt Allcroft (Thomas) Limited.

This series was narrated by Michael Angelis for the United Kingdom audiences, with George Carlin narrating the episodes for the United States audiences, on what was also his final series. This was also the final season where Thomas  appeared in the United States as a segment on Shining Time Station; after that it became a program on Mister Moose's Fun Time and Storytime With Thomas. This was the final series to be produced before the death of Wilbert Awdry in 1997.

Two of the episodes in this series have two titles: the original ones from the United Kingdom broadcasts are shown on top, while the American-adapted titles are shown underneath.

In the UK, episodes 1-3, 6, and 8-11 were first released on VHS with a different take of Michael Angelis' narrations than the later versions on TV and other VHS releases.

Production

Filming
Filming for Series 4 lasted from June to November 1994. On November 7, the first 8 episodes were released direct-to-video in the UK. On July 3, 1995 the rest of the series was released on 2 other UK VHS releases. Several episodes were also featured on the Shining Time Family Specials, released throughout 1995 in the US, before the series made its official UK television debut on October 16, 1995.

The 4th series saw the introduction of the smaller narrow gauge engines. For ease of filming, series 5 would introduce larger-scale versions of the characters, and from series 6, these larger models were used almost exclusively.

Stories
Half of the 3rd series had consisted of stories written by the show's staff, but only one original story, "Rusty to the Rescue" (written by Allcroft and Mitton), was written for the 4th series. The episodes which used The Railway Series did take some liberties with the source material, in order to fill the runtime and make the stories more accessible. From series 5 onward, all stories would be staff-written, without using the Awdrys' books as a source.

Stepney (a character based on a real-life engine and used to highlight the Preservation Movement in the books) was given an entirely different background when he was introduced. This decision carried on into later series, in which he was seen on either a fictionalized Bluebell Railway or as a member of The Fat Controller's railway.

The show had come under fire for having too few female characters, and a conscious decision was made to rewrite Rusty, who was always a male character in the books, as gender-neutral. Thomas''' new owners initially defended the decision, citing Rusty's gender neutrality since Series 4. Later releases of the same episode substituted male pronouns in reference to Rusty.

Talent
Initially, each episode was broadcast in installments of the children's television program Shining Time Station. 2 stories from Series 4 were aired in each of the hour-long "Family Specials" in 1995. The rest were broadcast in a 6-episode offshoot called Mr. Conductor's Thomas Tales in 1996. In 1999, they aired in a new half-hour program called Storytime with Thomas, which also included Series 5 episodes narrated by Alec Baldwin and episodes of Britt Allcroft's Magic Adventures of Mumfie.

Episodes

Characters

Introduced
 Stepney ("Rusty to the Rescue")
 Skarloey ("Four Little Engines")
 Rheneas ("Gallant Old Engine")
 Sir Handel ("Granpuff")
 Peter Sam ("Granpuff")
 Rusty ("Trucks")
 Duncan ("Home at Last")
 Duke ("Granpuff")
 Smudger ("Granpuff")
 S.C.Ruffey ("Toad Stands By")
 George ("Steam Roller")
 Caroline ("Train Stops Play")
 Bulstrode ("Special Attraction")
 The Refreshment Lady ("Peter Sam & the Refreshment Lady")
 Nancy ("Passengers & Polish")
 Tom Tipper ("Mind That Bike")
 D261 ("Bowled Out") (not named)

Recurring cast

 Thomas
 Edward
 Henry
 Gordon
 James
 Percy
 Toby
 Duck
 Donald and Douglas
 Oliver
 Daisy
 BoCo
 Mavis 
 Annie and Clarabel
 Troublesome Trucks
 Toad
 Harold
 The Fat Controller
 Jem Cole
 Diesel (not named)
 Farmer Trotter (not named)
 Bill and Ben (do not speak)
 Bertie (does not speak)
 Terence (cameo)
 Trevor (cameo)
 Bulgy (cameo)
 Stephen Hatt (cameo)
 Mrs. Kyndley (cameo)
 The Vicar of Wellsworth (cameo'')

Notes

References

1994 British television seasons
1995 British television seasons
Thomas & Friends seasons